J. Steven Wilkins (born 27 June 1950) is a conservative American Calvinist and evangelical pastor and author known for views on slavery in the United States.

Biography
Steve Wilkins holds degrees from the University of Alabama and the Reformed Theological Seminary of Jackson, Mississippi. He was ordained as a minister in the Presbyterian Church in America in 1976, and has served as the pastor of Church of the Redeemer in West Monroe, Louisiana since 1989.

In 2007, the Louisiana Presbytery was indicted by the PCA's Standing Judicial Commission for "failing to find a strong presumption of guilt" against Wilkins with regards to his theological views. Following this action, the congregation of Church of the Redeemer voted without dissent to withdraw from the PCA on January 27, 2008 and subsequently joined the Communion of Reformed Evangelical Churches.

Wilkins is an advocate of Federal Vision theology, and is a former board member of the League of the South.

In the pamphlet Southern Slavery, As It Was, Wilkins and co-author Douglas Wilson argued for a view that the status of slaves had not been as bad as is currently taught in American schools. He stated for example that: "slavery produced in the South a genuine affection between the races that we believe we can say has never existed in any nation before the War or since." Historians such as Peter H. Wood, Clayborne Carson, and Bancroft Prize winner Ira Berlin have condemned the pamphlet's arguments, with Wood calling them as spurious as holocaust denial.

Canon Press ceased publication of  the pamphlet when it became aware of serious citation errors in 24 passages authored by Wilkins where quotations, some lengthy, from the 1974 book Time on the Cross: The Economics of American Negro Slavery by Robert William Fogel and Stanley L. Engerman were not cited. Robert McKenzie, the history professor who first noticed the citation problems, described the authors as being "sloppy" rather than "malevolent" while also pointing out that he had reached out to Wilson several years earlier. Wilson reworked and redacted the arguments and published (without Wilkins) a new set of essays under the name Black & Tan after consulting with historian Eugene Genovese.

Writings
Wilkins is the author of 
 Face to Face: Meditations on Friendship and Hospitality
 Call of Duty: The Sterling Nobility of Robert E. Lee 
 All Things for Good: The Steadfast Fidelity of Stonewall Jackson
 The Federal Vision (editor)
 Southern Slavery, As It Was (ISBN 1-885767-17-X)

References

External linkChurch of the Redeemer
J. Steven Wilkins' Blog

1950 births
Living people
American Calvinist and Reformed ministers
Presbyterian Church in America ministers
University of Alabama alumni